Frankenweenie may refer to:

Frankenweenie (1984 film), a short live action film directed by Tim Burton
Frankenweenie (2012 film), Burton's full-length stop motion remake
Frankenweenie (soundtrack), soundtrack album to the 2012 film